Novopokrovka is an urban-type settlement in Dnipro Raion of Dnipropetrovsk Oblast in Ukraine. It is located on the banks of the Komyshuvata Sura, a tributary of the Mokra Sura in the drainage basin of the Dnieper. Novopokrovka hosts the administration of Novopokrovka settlement hromada, one of the hromadas of Ukraine. Population: 

Until 18 July 2020, Novopokrovka belonged to Solone Raion. The raion was abolished in July 2020 as part of the administrative reform of Ukraine, which reduced the number of raions of Dnipropetrovsk Oblast to seven. The area of Solone Raion was merged into Dnipro Raion.

Economy

Transportation
Novopokrovka has access to the M04 highway connecting Dnipro and Kropyvnytskyi, as well as to P73 highway with further connections to Zaporizhia and Nikopol.

There is infrequent passenger traffic.

References

Urban-type settlements in Dnipro Raion